GBP is the ISO 4217 currency code for the pound sterling, the British currency.

GBP may also refer to:

Science and technology
 Gain-bandwidth product, an audio amplification measurement
 Game Boy Player, a Nintendo GameCube to television connector
 Game Boy Pocket, a portable gaming console by Nintendo
Gastric bypass procedure, a medical operation for obesity
 Generalized belief propagation, an algorithm in graph theory
 Ginger beer plant, a culture of yeast and bacteria used to produce the drink
 Guanylate-binding protein
 An alias for HADHA, an enzyme

Organizations
 Golden Broadcast Professionals, a Philippines-based broadcasting company
 Green Bay Packers, a football team in the NFL

See also
 .gbp, a common Gerber file extension for bottom solder paste mask files
 Gbps, abbreviation for gigabit per second, a unit for data speeds